Lakshmi Tatma is an Indian girl born in 2005 in a village in Araria district, Bihar, with "4 arms and 4 legs." She was actually one of a pair of ischiopagus conjoined twins, one of which was headless because its head had atrophied and chest had not fully developed in the womb, causing the appearance of one child with four arms and four legs. She has undergone surgery to remove these extra limbs.

Background

Lakshmi's father, Shambhu, and mother, Poonam, were day laborers who earned less than 40 rupees per day and were unable to afford a separation surgery for their daughter. The daughter was named after Lakshmi, the Hindu goddess of wealth (who is depicted as four-armed). The girl was sometimes an object of worship as an incarnation of the goddess; by the age of two, she was known all over India. At one point, a circus offered the couple money to buy Lakshmi as a sideshow, which forced the family into hiding. At the time of being found by Sharan Patil, she had an infected pressure ulcer at the neck end of the parasitic twin and continuous fevers.

Surgery
Lakshmi was the subject of a surgery carried out by Sharan Patil and 30 other physicians which included Chief anesthetist Yohannan John at Sparsh Hospital in Bangalore, Karnataka.

The twins' two pelvises formed a single combined ring. Each twin had one working kidney. Lakshmi had a second kidney which was necrotic. The autosite's (Lakshmi herself) feet were affected by clubfoot.

Her abdominal aorta gave off iliac branches to the autosite's legs and continued as a main trunk artery which gave off iliac branches to the parasite's legs and continued, and finally forked into the parasite's subclavian arteries.

The parasitic twin's spine and abdomen merged with Lakshmi's body. The twins' backbones were joined end-to-end and nerves were entangled. Lakshmi could not crawl normally or walk, but she could drag herself around somewhat. Doctors surmised early on that without the operation, she would not be able to live into her teens. The surgery began on Tuesday, 6 November 2007, at 7:00a.m.IST (01:30UTC), and was planned to last 40hours at the most. An estimated cost of over US$625,000 was paid entirely by the hospital's charitable wing, the Sparsh Foundation. A team of more than 30 surgeons worked in shifts. The surgery lasted for 27 hours, and doctors gave Lakshmi a 75–80% chance of survival during the surgery.

The steps of the operation were:
 (8 hours): Abdominal operation: remove the parasite's abdominal organs.
  Remove the autosite's necrotic kidney and replace it with the parasite's kidney. Tie off the blood vessels that supplied the parasite.
 Move the reproductive system and the urinary bladder into the autosite.
 (6 to 8 hours) Amputate the parasite's legs at the hip joints: this caused heavy bleeding. Cut the joined backbone: the nerves around the joint were found to be extremely chaotic, and care had to be taken to avoid causing paralysis.
 Separation, at 12.30p.m. on 7 November 2007. The combined pelvic ring was divided through or near the parasite's hip joints and not at the pubic symphyses. The remaining incomplete pelvic ring was cut and bent to make the ends meet, and not left as an open part-circle.
 External fixation to hold the parts of the pelvis in place. This caused the pelvis to close in three weeks to the normal position.
 (4 hours): Suturing. Operation completed at 10:00a.m. on 7 November 2007.

Within a week of the surgery, doctors held a press conference showing Lakshmi being carried by her father. Her feet were still bandaged. She was in the hospital for a month after the operation.

Afterwards, she and her family moved to Sucheta Kriplani Shiksha Niketan in Jodhpur in Rajasthan, where Lakshmi and her brother joined a school for disabled children and her father got a job at the school's farm.

As of February 2008, a later operation was planned to bring her legs closer together. Another operation may be needed to rebuild her pelvic floor muscles.

A television program in 2010 showed her recovering well. It was found that cutting the conjoined vertebral column in the separation operation had not caused paralysis. She was operated on for clubfoot. X-rays showed that extra bone between the pubic symphysis (parts of the parasitic twin's ischium and pubis bones) had been absorbed or was not ossified. Slight scoliosis was found but would have to be corrected by a minor operation; her mother was unwilling for her to have to wear a spinal brace throughout childhood.

References

External links
 Spines of 2-year-old Lakshmi separated: Doctors Times of India 2007-11-06
 Many-limbed India girl in surgery BBC News 2007-11-06
 Surgery for girl with eight limbs is going smoothly doctors say (video) CNN 2007-11-06
 Surgery On Multi-Limbed Girl A Success (with video and photographs) CBS News 2007-11-07
 Girl Born With 4 Arms, 4 Legs Has Successful Surgery ABC News 2007-11-07
 Girl separation surgery a success (with video) BBC News 2007-11-07

2005 births
Living people
People with parasitic twins
People from Araria
Indian children
Indian twins
2005 in India
2007 in India
Medicine in India
Surgical procedures and techniques